Vișina Nouă is a commune in Olt County, Oltenia, Romania. It is composed of a single village, Vișina Nouă. This was part of Vădastra Commune until 2004, when it was split off.

References

Communes in Olt County
Localities in Oltenia